Rick and Morty is an American animated  science fiction sitcom created by Justin Roiland and Dan Harmon. The series follows Rick Sanchez, an alcoholic, nihilistic super-scientist, and his easily distressed grandson, Morty Smith to parallel dimensions and exotic planets with extraterrestrials. These adventures commonly cause trouble for Morty's familyJerry, Beth, and Summerwho are often dragged along as well. The series premiered on December 2, 2013 on Cartoon Network's late-night programming block Adult Swim. On May 10, 2018, Adult Swim announced a long-term deal with the creators, ordering 70 new episodes of Rick and Morty, through to a tenth season.

The sixth season premiered on September 4, 2022.

Series overview

Episodes

Season 1 (2013–14)

Season 2 (2015)

Season 3 (2017)

Season 4 (2019–20)

Season 5 (2021)

Season 6 (2022)

Ratings

Other media

Short films

A six-minute short film titled Samurai & Shogun aired unannounced on Adult Swim's Toonami programming block on March 29, 2020, during the hiatus of the fourth season of Rick and Morty, before being uploaded to Adult Swim's YouTube channel the following day. Another eight-minute short film titled Rick & Morty vs. Genocider aired unannounced on Toonami on July 26, 2020, debuting on YouTube slightly after. A third short film, titled Summer Meets God (Rick Meets Evil) and also written and directed by Takashi Sano, was released on YouTube on August 2, 2021 and aired on Adult Swim the following day. A fourth short film, titled The Great Yokai Battle of Akihabara, directed by Masaru Matsumoto and written by Naohiro Fukushima, was released on YouTube on October 10, 2021 and aired on Adult Swim the following day. A fifth short film, titled Samurai and Shogun Part 2 and featuring the return of Samurai & Shogun'''s Kaichi Sato as writer and director, was released on YouTube on November 12, 2021 as part of the 2021 Adult Swim Festival.

Webisodes

The Non-Canonical Adventures (2016–21)
On October 26, 2016, Adult Swim began releasing a web series of claymation shorts, Rick and Morty: The Non-Canonical Adventures. Written and directed by Lee Hardcastle, the shorts follow Rick and Morty characters into parodies of scenes from various science-fiction and horror films. The title of each short is the same as that of the film the short is parodying, and each episode ends with the Adult Swim logo [as] integrated in the scene. On November 1, 2019, Hardcastle released a video compiling all the shorts, while also releasing the last ten previously unreleased shorts. Additional shorts were later released in 2021.

 Other webisodes 

 Vindicators 2 (2022) 

On May 20, 2021, Adult Swim announced a short spin-off series entitled The Vindicators was in development, alongside spin-offs from other Adult Swim shows like Aqua Teen Hunger Force, Robot Chicken, and Your Pretty Face Is Going to Hell. The ten-episode series premiered on Adult Swim's YouTube channel—each episode runs between two and three minutes. The series centers on the characters Supernova, Vance Maximus, Alan Rails, Crocubot, Million Ants, and Noob Noob previously introduced in the Season 3 episode "Vindicators 3: The Return of Worldender". Each episode is written by Sarah Carbiener and Erica Rosbe, and directed by Maite Garcia. The series is produced by Atomic Cartoons.

 Animatic scene 
In August 2016, Adult Swim posted an "animatic" scene entitled State of Georgia Vs. Denver Fenton Allen on YouTube. This consisted of the voices of Rick and Morty reenacting a transcript of a real-life court case of the same name. The visual animation consisted of only basic, black-and-white sketches. In October 2016, a fan-made fully-animated production version of the scene was released on YouTube, with the title Judge Morty: State of Georgia Vs. Rick Allen.'' It was later blocked by Turner on copyright grounds, but many fans have since reuploaded the video online.

Notes

References

External links

 
 

Rick and Morty episodes
Rick and Morty
Rick and Morty
Rick and Morty